Three ships of the United States Navy have borne the name USS Cohasset, in honor of Cohasset, Massachusetts

 , was a tugboat. Originally called E. D. Fogg and later Narragansett, she was built in 1860 and purchased by the Navy in 1861. She was sold in 1892.
 , was a cargo ship, built in 1918 and decommissioned in 1919.

Sources

United States Navy ship names